Christ the Redeemer is a 1493 tempera on canvas painting by Andrea Mantegna. It is now in the Pinacoteca civica in Correggio, Emilia-Romagna.

Bibliography
 Tatjana Pauli, Mantegna, serie Art Book, Leonardo Arte, Milano 2001. 

1493 paintings
Paintings by Andrea Mantegna